Pierre Eugène Montézin (16 October 1874 – 10 July 1946) was a French painter. His work was part of the painting event in the art competition at the 1932 Summer Olympics. He was a close friend of the Swiss painter, Hans Iten, and the Ulster Museum hold a portrait of Iten by Montezin donated by his widow.

References

External links
 

1874 births
1946 deaths
20th-century French painters
20th-century French male artists
French male painters
Olympic competitors in art competitions
Painters from Paris